Mintu Sandhu is a Canadian politician, who was elected to the Legislative Assembly of Manitoba in the 2019 Manitoba general election. He represents the electoral district of The Maples as a member of the New Democratic Party of Manitoba.

Born and raised in India, Sandhu moved to Canada in 1989. Prior to his election to the legislature, he worked as the manager of the city's Unicity Taxi service.

References

New Democratic Party of Manitoba MLAs
Politicians from Winnipeg
Living people
Indian emigrants to Canada
21st-century Canadian politicians
Year of birth missing (living people)